Illuminate is the second studio album by Canadian singer and songwriter Shawn Mendes. It was released on September 23, 2016, through Island Records and Universal Music Group. Musically, the album contains music genres pop, rock and blues. The album debuted atop the US Billboard 200 and the Canadian Albums Chart. It was preceded by the lead single "Treat You Better", which reached the top 10 on the Billboard Hot 100. This album was supported by the Illuminate World Tour, which began in March 2017.

Singles
"Treat You Better" was released as the lead single from the album on June 3, 2016. The music video was released on July 12, 2016. It features a storyline where Mendes would like to help the girl in an abusive relationship, and he can treat her better. The song currently has almost two billion views on YouTube. Since its release, "Treat You Better" has peaked at number 6 on the US Billboard Hot 100.

"Mercy" was serviced to US top 40 radio stations as the second single from the album on October 18, 2016.

"There's Nothing Holdin' Me Back" was released as the album's third single on April 20, 2017. The song debuted at number 7 in the United Kingdom, becoming his highest debut in the country. It also debuted in the top ten in Australia and Denmark. The iTunes version of both the standard and deluxe versions of Illuminate were reissued with "There's Nothing Holdin' Me Back" as track one upon the single's release.

Promotional singles
Along with the pre-order of Illuminate, "Ruin" was released as the album's first promotional single on July 8, 2016. Its music video was released on July 18, 2016.

On July 28, 2016, "Three Empty Words" was released as the second promotional single from the album.

"Mercy" was released as the album's third and final promotional single on August 18, 2016. Its music video was released on September 21, 2016, receiving over 200 million views. It features Mendes in a car which is filling up with water and it also features Mendes trashing a room with guitars, a drum-set and a piano.

Critical reception

The album received generally positive reviews from music critics.

Writing for Rolling Stone, Joe Levy noted "Illuminate mixes professions of romantic agony like "Mercy" (where a quietly hummed hook explodes into crashing drums), with nice-boy valentines like "Treat You Better" and bedroom come-ons like "Lights On"" while naming the album "disarmingly intimate." Jon Reyes of Idolator, wrote that "[Shawn's] most noticeable change, aside from the tight music hall sonics, is the subtle infusion of sex into the lyrics" as well as feeling that the record as a whole "displays his lyrical development" and "polishes a proven formula."

Stephen Thomas Erlewine of AllMusic wrote that the album has "a bit of grace and warmth" and that Mendes "came into his own on Illuminate while also complimenting his "small and sweet" voice and how he "has gelled into his pop persona." Sonia de Freitas, writing for Renowned for Sound, noticed that it "is apparent that Mendes has shifted to a more mature and soulful sound, and far more introspective lyrical content" while praising his vocals, writing that "he sings earnestly, with an emotive delivery in every song."

Billboard listed the track "Don't Be a Fool" at number 90 for the best deep cuts from 21st century pop stars. Associated Press listed it at number 5 on their best albums of 2016.

Accolades

Commercial performance
Illuminate debuted at number one on the US Billboard 200 with 145,000 equivalent album units, of which 121,000 copies were pure album sales. It became Mendes' second number-one album in the US and his best sales week. Mendes achieved his second number one at 18 years, two months and seven days old, becoming the fifth youngest artist to score their first two number one, following Justin Bieber, Miley Cyrus, Hilary Duff and LeAnn Rimes. In addition, Mendes is the first artist to have their first two full-length studio albums hit number one since 5 Seconds of Summer bowed at number one with Sounds Good Feels Good (2015) and their self-titled debut album (2014), and the first male artist to claim the distinction since 2015, when ASAP Rocky bowed atop the list with At. Long. Last. ASAP, following 2013’s Long. Live. ASAP.

In his native Canada, the album debuted at number one with 21,000 total consumption units, of which 17,000 were album units sold, surpassing the highest one week sales total reached with his last album, Handwritten. Illuminate also picked up 3.8 million audio on-demand streams, the second highest total of the week, trailing only Drake's Views.

Track listing

Charts

Weekly charts

Year-end charts

Decade-end charts

Certifications

References

2016 albums
Albums produced by Jake Gosling
Albums recorded at Noble Street Studios
Island Records albums
Shawn Mendes albums
Universal Records albums